"When You're Falling" is a song by world music group Afro Celt Sound System, released as the first single from the band's third studio album Volume 3: Further in Time. The song features vocals from British singer Peter Gabriel.

The song's music video, directed by Adam Berg, features a man falling from the sky until he eventually falls through the ground, where he continues to fall until he eventually falls out of Earth. Peter Gabriel appears three times during the music video, as an airplane pilot, a man inside a building and a man walking on the street, all of them witnessing the man falling at one point.

Track listing
CD single (UK)
 "When You're Falling" (Short radio edit) – 3:44
 "When You're Falling" (Wren & Morley Mix) – 4:35
 "When You're Falling" (Album version) – 5:16
 "When You're Falling" (video)

Promo CD single (UK)
 "When You're Falling" (Short radio edit) – 3:40
 "When You're Falling" (Long radio edit) – 4:14

Promo CD single (US)
 "When You're Falling" (Short radio edit) – 3:40
 "When You're Falling" (Long radio edit) – 4:14
 "When You're Falling" (Album version) – 5:14
 Call-out hook

Charts

References

2001 singles
Peter Gabriel songs
2001 songs